Raquel Gomes Ramos Pereira (born 6 January 2000) is a Portuguese swimmer who has set multiple national records. She competed in the women's 200 metre breaststroke event at the 2020 European Aquatics Championships, in Budapest, Hungary.

References

External links
 

2000 births
Living people
Portuguese female breaststroke swimmers
Place of birth missing (living people)
Swimmers at the 2015 European Games
European Games competitors for Portugal
Swimmers at the 2018 Summer Youth Olympics
Mediterranean Games medalists in swimming
Mediterranean Games bronze medalists for Portugal
21st-century Portuguese women